Walter Nesbit Taylor (January 23, 1874 - November 27, 1956) was an American educator and a Mississippi state senator, representing the state's 12th district as a Democrat, from 1924 to 1936.

Biography 
Walter Nesbit Taylor was born on January 23, 1874, near Lodi, Montgomery County, Mississippi. He was the son of William Pratt Taylor, an Alabama native, and Wilmoth Ann "Annie" (Hurt) Taylor. He received a B. S. degree from Mississippi College in 1897. He also received his M. A. from there in 1898. He then served as the principal of their preparatory department from 1899 to 1903. He was a high school principal in Florence, Mississippi, from 1905 to 1909. From 1910 to 1915, he was the superintendent of the Montgomery County agricultural high schools, and from 1915 to 1921, he was the superintendent of the Hinds County agricultural high schools. In 1921, he became the executive secretary of the Mississippi Education Association. He was a member of the Mississippi State Senate, one of the three senators representing Hinds and Warren counties in the 12th district, from 1924 until 1936. In 1940, he co-edited a 4-volume book on the history of the state of Mississippi. He was the Secretary of the State Teachers Retirement System from 1944 until his retirement in 1953. He died in the Baptist Hospital in Jackson, Mississippi, on November 27, 1956.

Personal life 
Taylor was a Democrat. He married Lois Fuller, who survived him after his death, in 1898. They had three children, a son and two daughters. Taylor's cousin was Mississippi state treasurer John Peroutt Taylor.

References 

1874 births
1956 deaths
Democratic Party Mississippi state senators
People from Jackson, Mississippi
School superintendents in Mississippi